Czech Symphony Orchestra may refer to:

 the Prague-based project orchestra CSO, view: Czech Symphony Orchestra (1994)
 the Janáček Philharmonic Orchestra used this name for their US-Tour in 2009
 former name of City of Prague Philharmonic Orchestra
 the Film Symphony Orchestra used this name for their international live performances in the 1990s